The Great Cognito is a 1982 Oscar-nominated claymation short directed by Will Vinton.

Plot
A monologist talks about war, adopting the faces of World War II-era figures.

Accolades
1983: Nominated for an Academy Award for Best Animated Short Film

Preservation
The Academy Film Archive preserved The Great Cognito in 2012.

References

External links
 
 The Great Cognito on YouTube
 The Great Cognito on AllMovie

1982 films
1982 short films
American animated short films
Films directed by Will Vinton
1982 animated films
American World War II films
1980s English-language films
1980s American films